Ichon Airport(이천비행장) is an airport in Kangwon-do, North Korea.

Facilities 
The airfield has a single grass runway 07/25 measuring 3910 x 197 feet (1192 x 60 m).  It is sited in a river plain and is only 30 km from the Military Demarcation Line.

References 

Airports in North Korea